Charles Carteret Corfe (8 June 1847 – 26 June 1935) was a cricketer in New Zealand and a school headmaster in New Zealand and Australia.

Early life
Corfe's father Arthur Thomas Corfe was the headmaster at Elizabeth College in Guernsey, where Charles gained his school education. He then studied mathematics at Jesus College, Cambridge, gaining his BA degree in 1869. He won athletics blues in 1867, 1868 and 1869.

Teaching career
Corfe went to New Zealand to teach at Christ's College in Christchurch in 1871.  He was headmaster at Christ's College from 1873 to 1888. His resignation was forced by the board as they wanted to see a classically trained cleric at the helm of the school rather than a scientist. However, he received high praise from the Christ's College Register in his obituary. One of the school's houses—Corfe House—is named for him.

Corfe went from Christchurch to Toowoomba Grammar School in Queensland, where he was headmaster from 1890 to 1900. The Year 7 boarding house, Corfe House, is named after him. He later occupied relieving positions at schools in Australasia, including at Christ's College during the First World War.

Cricket career
He played first-class cricket for Canterbury from 1871 to 1884. In 1875 against Otago he scored 88 in a little over two hours from "some really fine cricket, playing the bail balls from all the bowlers well down, and hitting well when a chance offered". It was the highest first-class individual score in New Zealand until George Watson of Canterbury made the first century in 1881.

Personal life
He married Emily Hudson Evison in St Paul's Cathedral, Melbourne, on 17 December 1874. They had four sons and a daughter. After Emily died, Charles lived with his widowed daughter in England for the last seven years of his life.

References

External links

1847 births
1935 deaths
Guernsey cricketers
People educated at Elizabeth College, Guernsey
Alumni of Jesus College, Cambridge
Canterbury cricketers
New Zealand cricketers
New Zealand educators
Australian headmasters